Norton House may refer to:

in England
Norton House (Somerset), now-demolished Georgian mansion in Midsomer Norton, Somerset.

in United States
Norton House (Yuma, Arizona), listed on the National Register of Historic Places (NRHP) in Yuma County
Norton House (Branford, Connecticut), NRHP-listed in New Haven County
Charles H. Norton House, Plainville, Connecticut, NRHP-listed
Norton Fish Cabin at Captiva Rocks, Bokeelia, Florida, NRHP-listed
Robert Lee Norton House, Cypress, Florida, NRHP-listed
Gould Hyde Norton House, Eustis, Florida, NRHP-listed
Norton House (West Palm Beach, Florida), NRHP-listed
C. S. Norton Mansion, Bedford, Indiana, listed on the NRHP in Indiana
Norton, Charles Henry and Charlotte, House, Avoca, Iowa, listed on the NRHP in Iowa
Norton House Historic District, Falmouth, Maine, NRHP-listed
William F. Norton House, Kingfield, Maine, NRHP-listed
Norton House (Swansea, Massachusetts), NRHP-listed
W. H. Norton House, Columbus, Montana, listed on the NRHP in Montana
Rev. Asahel Norton Homestead, Kirkland, New York, NRHP-listed
Clark-Norton House, Grants Pass, Oregon, listed on the NRHP in Oregon
Norton-Orgain House, Salado, Texas, listed on the NRHP in Texas
Pearl C. Norton House, Wauwatosa, Wisconsin, NRHP-listed in Milwaukee County